Kleshas may refer to:

Kleshas (Hinduism), spiritual afflictions in Hinduism
Kleshas (Buddhism), negative mental states in Buddhism